Damien John Frawley (born 31 July 1962) is a former international rugby union player.

Frawley was born in Rockhampton, Queensland. He attended St Joseph's College, Gregory Terrace, and played four matches for the Australian Schoolboys before representing the Queensland Reds. He played ten times for the Australian Wallabies (player #655) between 1986 and 1988. After he retired from the game he moved to Sydney, where he coached the Norths Pirates to two Premierships.

References

Living people
1962 births
Australia international rugby union players
Australian rugby union players
Queensland Reds players
Rugby union locks
Rugby union players from Queensland